Preaek Luong is a khum (commune) of Aek Phnum District in Battambang Province in north-western Cambodia.

Villages

 Preaek Luong
 Sdei Leu
 Sdei Kraom
 Rohal Suong
 Bak Amraek
 Doun Ent
 Bak Roteh

References

Communes of Battambang province
Aek Phnum District